The 6th National Congress of the Chinese Communist Party was held from June 18 - July 11, 1928, in Moscow.  Talks were held with the All-Union Communist Party (Bolsheviks), which had been the ruling party since 1922, when the Soviet Union began.

It was preceded by the 5th National Congress. It set in motion the 6th Central Committee of the Chinese Communist Party.  It was held to address the failures of the First Great Communist Revolution in China.  The revolution resulted in the Shanghai Massacre.  The Chinese Civil War began after that point, and there would not be another Party congress until 1945.

It was succeeded by the 7th National Congress.

During the 100th anniversary of the Chinese Communist Party in 2021, the Federal Archival Agency of Russia gave China documents on the 6th congress.

References

National Congress of the Chinese Communist Party
1945 in China
1945 conferences